Sulfate crust is a zone observed in the axial (central) parts of burning coal dumps and related sites. It is a zone built mainly by anhydrous sulfate minerals, such as godovikovite and millosevichite. The outer zone can easily be hydrated giving rise to minerals like tschermigite and alunogen.

See also
 Coal seam fire
 Coal underground fires

References

Coal mining
Combustion
Sulfate minerals